Gmajnica is a settlement in the Municipality of Komenda in the Upper Carniola region of Slovenia.

Name
The name Gmajnica is a diminutive of the common noun gmajna 'commons', referring to land that was jointly owned and used by the village community. The noun gmajna is a borrowing from Middle High German gemeine, with the same meaning, and it is found in other Slovene toponyms such as Gmajna near Krško.

References

External links 

Gmajnica on Geopedia

Populated places in the Municipality of Komenda